"Under Pressure" is a 1981 song by Queen and David Bowie.

Under Pressure may also refer to:

Books
 Under Pressure (cookbook), a 2008 cookbook by Thomas Keller
 Under Pressure, the serial title of The Dragon in the Sea, a 1956 novel by Frank Herbert

Films
 Under Pressure (1935 film), a drama directed by Raoul Walsh
 Under Pressure (1997), an alternative title for Bad Day on the Block, a thriller starring Charlie Sheen
 Under Pressure (2000 film), a television film  starring Rob Lowe

Music
 Under Pressure (album), a 2014 album by Logic
 Under Pressure (Such a Surge album), a 1995 album by Such a Surge
 "Under Pressure (Ice Ice Baby)", a 2010 mashup by John & Edward featuring Vanilla Ice
"Under Pressure", a 2019 song by Ashley Tisdale from Symptoms
"Under Pressure", a 1990 song by Billy Connolly
"Under Pressure", a 1980 song by DNA
"Under Pressure", a 1997 song by Beres Hammond
"Under Pressure", a 2014 song by Logic (rapper) from the same titled album.
"Under Pressure", a 1989 song by Ras Kimono from the same titled album.
"Under Pressure", a 1995 song by The Flaming Lips
"Under Pressure", a song by Stephanie Mills from her 1985 self-titled album

Television
 "Under Pressure" (D:TNG episode), an episode of Degrassi: The Next Generation
 "Under Pressure" (Modern Family), an episode of Modern Family
 "Under Pressure", an episode of the TV series Digimon Adventure
 "Under Pressure", an episode of the TV series ER
 Sob Pressão (English: Under Pressure), a 2017 Brazilian medical drama TV series

See also
 "Got Me Under Pressure", a 1983 song by ZZ Top